The Schafberg is a mountain, on the western edge of the Swabian Jura near Balingen in the German state of Baden-Württemberg.

It is part of the Balingen Mountains (Balinger Bergen) and is surrounded by the towns and villages of Roßwangen, Weilstetten (both in the borough of Balingen), Tieringen (borough of Meßstetten) and Hausen am Tann. Its neighbouring mountains are the Plettenberg and the Lochenstein.

From the viewing points of Hoher Fels and Gespaltener Fels there are very good views of the surrounding area. Walks link the Balingen Mountains and the North Swabian Jura Way (Schwäbische-Alb-Nordrand-Weg) runs over the Schafberg. The Schafberg lies within the Upper Danube Nature Park.

Gallery

References 

Mountains and hills of the Swabian Jura
Zollernalbkreis
One-thousanders of Germany
Mountains and hills of Baden-Württemberg